Sary-Yelga (Harıyılğa) is a rural locality (a village) in Khalikeyevsky Selsoviet, Sterlibashevsky District, Bashkortostan, Russia. The population was 6 as of 2010. There is 1 street.

Geography 
Sary-Yelga is located 10 km south of Sterlibashevo (the district's administrative centre) by road. Khalikeyevo is the nearest rural locality.

References 

Rural localities in Sterlibashevsky District